Pius Dorn (born 24 September 1996) is a German professional footballer who plays as a midfielder for Swiss club Luzern.

Club career
Dorn made his Austrian Football First League debut for Austria Lustenau on 4 August 2017 in a game against Wiener Neustadt.

In the summer of 2022, Dorn signed a two-year contract with Swiss Super League club Luzern.

References

External links
 

Living people
1996 births
Sportspeople from Freiburg im Breisgau
Footballers from Baden-Württemberg
German footballers
Association football midfielders
2. Liga (Austria) players
Regionalliga players
Swiss Challenge League players
Swiss Super League players
SC Freiburg II players
SC Austria Lustenau players
FC Vaduz players
FC Thun players
FC Luzern players
German expatriate footballers
Expatriate footballers in Austria
German expatriate sportspeople in Austria
Expatriate footballers in Switzerland
German expatriate sportspeople in Switzerland
Expatriate footballers in Liechtenstein
German expatriate sportspeople in Liechtenstein